Madurese cuisine is a cuisine tradition of Madurese people from Madura Island in Indonesia. This cuisine also known in East Java as well as on the south coast of Kalimantan. Madura cuisine has salty, savoury and spicy tastes with Javanese-influenced.

Madurese foods add petis ikan which is made from fish instead of shrimp. The Madurese-style satay is probably the most popular satay variants in Indonesia. Some of its popular dishes are chicken satay, mutton satay, Madurese soto, goat soup and peanut sauce. As a leading salt production center in Indonesian archipelago, Madura dishes are often saltier compared to other East Javanese foods.

List of Madurese foods

Dishes
 Bebek guring, traditional seasoned fried duck.
 Bebek sinjay, juicy fried duck with sambals.
 Campor, broth mixed with peanut sauce.
 Kaldu kokot, green beans cooked with beef broth.
 Nasek bebek, rice dish with duck meat. This dish almost similar to duck rice.
 Nasek campur, Madurese-style of mixed rice dish with assorted vegetables and meat of choice.
 Nasek jagung, steamed rice substitution with cornmeal.
 Nasek serundeng, rice dish served with serundeng.
 Rojak cengur, mixture of vegetables, tofu, tempeh, lontong, beansprouts with petis black fish paste sauce and slices of boiled cow's lips.
 Sate madura, famous satay variant that most often made from mutton or chicken, the recipe's main characteristic is the black sauce made from sweet soy sauce mixed with palm sugar, garlic, deep fried shallots, peanut paste, shrimp paste, candlenut and salt.
 Sate ayam, satay made of chicken meat.
 Sate kambing, satay made of mutton or goat meat.
 Serundeng, spicy fried coconut flakes, which is made from sautéing grated coconut, and is often used as a side dish to accompany rice.
 Soto madura, soto soup made with either chicken, beef or offal, in a yellowish transparent broth.
 Sup kambing, mutton soup prepared with goat meat, tomato, celery, spring onion, ginger, candlenut and lime leaf, its broth is yellowish in colour.

Snacks and desserts
 Apem, traditional cake of steamed dough made of rice flour, coconut milk, yeast and palm sugar, usually served with grated coconut.
 Dawet, iced sweet dessert that contains droplets of green rice flour jelly, coconut milk and palm sugar syrup.
 Lopis, traditional sweet cake made of glutinous rice, served with grated coconut and drizzled with thick coconut sugar syrup.

See also

 Cuisine of Indonesia
 List of Indonesian dishes
 Madurese people
 Javanese cuisine

References

 
 
Indonesian cuisine-related lists